Roy Appleyard (birth registered second ¼ 1950) is an English former professional rugby league footballer who played in the 1960s and 1970s. He played at club level for Normanton ARLFC, and Castleford (Heritage № 517).

Background
Roy Appleyard's birth was registered in Lower Agbrigg, Wakefield,  West Riding of Yorkshire, England.

References

External links
Search for "Appleyard" at rugbyleagueproject.org
Memory Box Search at archive.castigersheritage.com

1950 births
Living people
Castleford Tigers players
English rugby league players
Rugby league players from Wakefield
Sportspeople from Normanton, West Yorkshire